A hepatocyte is a cell of the main parenchymal tissue of the liver. Hepatocytes make up 80% of the liver's mass. 
These cells are involved in:
 Protein synthesis 
 Protein storage
 Transformation of carbohydrates
 Synthesis of cholesterol, bile salts and phospholipids
 Detoxification, modification, and excretion of exogenous and endogenous substances
 Initiation of formation and secretion of bile

Structure
The typical hepatocyte is cubical with sides of 20-30 μm, (in comparison, a human hair has a diameter of 17 to 180 μm). The typical volume of a hepatocyte is 3.4 x 10−9 cm3.
Smooth endoplasmic reticulum is abundant in hepatocytes, in contrast to most other cell types.

Microanatomy
Hepatocytes display an eosinophilic cytoplasm, reflecting numerous mitochondria, and basophilic stippling due to large amounts of smooth endoplasmic reticulum and free ribosomes. Brown lipofuscin granules are also observed (with increasing age) together with irregular unstained areas of cytoplasm; these correspond to cytoplasmic glycogen and lipid stores removed during histological preparation. The average life span of the hepatocyte is 5 months; they are able to regenerate.

Hepatocyte nuclei are round with dispersed chromatin and prominent nucleoli. Anisokaryosis (or variation in the size of the nuclei) is common and often reflects tetraploidy and other degrees of polyploidy, a normal feature of 30-40% of hepatocytes in the adult human liver. Binucleate cells are also common.

Hepatocytes are organised into plates separated by vascular channels (sinusoids), an arrangement supported by a reticulin (collagen type III) network. The hepatocyte plates are one cell thick in mammals and two cells thick in the chicken. Sinusoids display a discontinuous, fenestrated endothelial cell lining. The endothelial cells have no basement membrane and are separated from the hepatocytes by the space of Disse, which drains lymph into the portal tract lymphatics.

Kupffer cells are scattered between endothelial cells; they are part of the reticuloendothelial system and phagocytose spent erythrocytes. Stellate (Ito) cells store vitamin A and produce extracellular matrix and collagen; they are also distributed amongst endothelial cells but are difficult to visualise by light microscopy.

Function

Protein synthesis
The hepatocyte is a cell in the body that manufactures serum albumin, fibrinogen, and the prothrombin group of clotting factors (except for Factors 3 and 4).

It is the main site for the synthesis of lipoproteins, ceruloplasmin, transferrin, complement, and glycoproteins.
Hepatocytes manufacture their own structural proteins and intracellular enzymes.

The endoplasmic reticulum (ER) is involved in conjugation of proteins to lipid and carbohydrate moieties synthesized by, or modified within, the hepatocytes. 

Proteins produced by hepatocytes that function as hormones are known as hepatokines.

Carbohydrate metabolism

The liver forms fatty acids from carbohydrates and synthesizes triglycerides from fatty acids and glycerol.
Hepatocytes also synthesize apoproteins with which they then assemble and export lipoproteins (VLDL, HDL).

The liver is also the main site in the body for gluconeogenesis, the formation of carbohydrates from precursors such as alanine, glycerol, and oxaloacetate.

Lipid metabolism
The liver receives many lipids from the systemic circulation and metabolizes chylomicron remnants.
It also synthesizes cholesterol from acetate and further synthesizes bile salts.
The liver is the sole site of bile salts formation.

Detoxification
Hepatocytes have the ability to metabolize, detoxify, and inactivate exogenous compounds such as drugs (see drug metabolism), insecticides, and endogenous compounds such as steroids.

The drainage of the intestinal venous blood into the liver requires efficient detoxification of miscellaneous absorbed substances to maintain homeostasis and protect the body against ingested toxins.

One of the detoxifying functions of hepatocytes is to modify ammonia into urea for excretion.

The most abundant organelle in liver cells is the smooth endoplasmic reticulum.

Society and culture

Use in research
Primary hepatocytes are commonly used in cell biological and biopharmaceutical research. In vitro model systems based on hepatocytes have been of great help to better understand the role of hepatocytes in (patho)physiological processes of the liver. In addition, pharmaceutical industry has heavily relied on the use of hepatocytes in suspension or culture to explore mechanisms of drug metabolism and even predict in vivo drug metabolism. 
For these purposes, hepatocytes are usually isolated from animal or human  whole liver or liver tissue by collagenase digestion, which is a two-step process.  In the first step, the liver is placed in an isotonic solution, in which calcium is removed to disrupt cell-cell tight junctions by the use of a calcium chelating agent. Next, a solution containing collagenase is added to separate the hepatocytes from the liver stroma. This process creates a suspension of hepatocytes, which can be seeded in multi-well  plates and cultured for many days or even weeks. For optimal results, culture plates should first be coated with an extracellular matrix (e.g. collagen, Matrigel) to promote hepatocyte attachment (typically within 1-3 hr after seeding) and maintenance of the hepatic phenotype. In addition, and overlay with an additional layer of extracellular matrix is often performed to establish a sandwich culture of hepatocytes. The application of a sandwich configuration supports prolonged maintenance of hepatocytes in culture. Freshly-isolated hepatocytes that are not used immediately can be cryopreserved and stored. They do not proliferate in culture. Hepatocytes are intensely sensitive to damage during the cycles of cryopreservation including freezing and thawing. Even after the addition of classical cryoprotectants there is still damage done while being cryopreserved. Nevertheless, recent cryopreservation and resuscitation protocols support application of cryopreserved hepatocytes for most biopharmaceutical applications.

Additional images

See also 
List of human cell types derived from the germ layers

References

External links
  - "Ultrastructure of the Cell: hepatocytes and sinusoids"
 Hepatic Histology: Hepatocytes (Colorado State University

Liver anatomy
Animal cells
Human cells